The Asian and Oceanian Zone is one of the three zones of regional Davis Cup competition in 2009.

In the Asian and Oceanian Zone there are four different groups in which teams compete against each other to advance to the next group.

Participating teams

Draw

 and  relegated to Group III in 2010.
 promoted to Group I in 2010.

First Round Matches

Philippines vs. Hong Kong

Pakistan vs. Oman

Indonesia vs. Kuwait

Malaysia vs. New Zealand

Play-offs

Hong Kong vs. Oman

Kuwait vs. Malaysia

Second Round Matches

Philippines vs. Pakistan

Indonesia vs. New Zealand

Third Round Matches

Philippines vs. New Zealand

External links
Davis Cup draw details

Group II
Davis Cup Asia/Oceania Zone